Odyssey (released 1990 in Oslo, Norway on the KKV label - FXCD101) is an album by Norwegian pianist Ketil Bjørnstad.

Reception
The Emusic review awarded the album 4 stars.

Track listing 
«Land» (5:20) Wedding March After Myllarguten
«Riva» (4:45)
«Odyssey» (13:30) Terje Vigen-Suite
«Vind» (3:25) Sally Garden - Traditional
«Molo» (5:25)
«Sang» (2:53)
«Laguna» (5:07)
«Rav» (5:02)
«Campo» (3:40)
«Akt» (6:05)
«1814» (7:08) Fugue and Homecoming

Personnel 
Ketil Bjørnstad - piano
Frode Alnæs - guitar
Alfred Janson - accordion
Arild Andersen - bass
Pål Thowsen - drums

Credits 
All compositions by Ketil Bjørnstad, except «Land» by Ketil Bjørnstad/Myllarguten, and «Vind» by Ketil Bjørnstad/Trad
Produced by Ketil Bjørnstad
Recorded & mixed by Jan Erik Kongshaug at Rainbow Studio, Oslo, Norway, August 1990
Engineer - Jan Erik Kongshaug
Mastering - The Cutting Room, Stockholm, Sweden
Photo and Cover Design - Per Fronth

References

External links 
 Ketil Bjørnstad Official Website

1990 albums
Ketil Bjørnstad albums